Fanery is the traditional money used in Madagascar. It exists in silver, copper, nickel and aluminium forms and are found in various sizes. Apart from being used as an instrument, Fanery was also used as jewellery and medication. Prior to 1895 there was no local currency, hence the inhabitants of Madagascar transformed the foreign coins into Fanery.

Definition 
The word "Fanery" has its origins in the local dialects spoken in Southern Madagascar.
These differ considerably from the official "Malagache" dialects spoken by the local tribesmen
Of Bara, Antanosy and Mahafaly. They exist in silver, copper, nickel and aluminium and are found in various sizes. Prior to French colonization, mining in Madagascar was non-existent.
As a result, metals of all kinds were in extremely short supply, and to manufacture Fanery the makers had to resort to melting the foreign coins (mostly French) that had been introduced into the territory over the previous 200 years.

History 
The southernmost tip of Madagascar has an ever-changing landscape of savannahs, deserts and spiny forests.  There live the Bara, the Mahafaly, the Antandroy, the Sakalava and the Antanosy to name a few of the local tribes.  As long ago as the 16th Century they made their first contacts with foreigners in the form of Portuguese invaders in the Fort Dauphin/Antalagnaro area and the English settlers who arrived in St. Augustin, which is close to the present-day towns  of Tulear and Toliara. These Europeans brought various metals for trading purposes, usually in the form of silver Mexican Pesos and later French 5-Franc coins, and these currencies co-existed prior to French Colonial rule. Two forms of traditional money made from imported coins co-existed prior to French colonial rule. 

In January 1900 French money became the only legal currency in Madagascar. The use of "Monnaie Coupee" continued for a further five years until 1905 when it was felt that an adequate supply of French coins and notes was in circulation.

Because most of the inhabitants believed that money (Malagache : "vola") also had magical properties, some of these Fanery have survived in the hands of local healers called mpisikidy (or "witch doctor"), ombiasa ("healer"), or olona-be-hasina ("wise man"). They used these to fabricate a talisman or lucky charm, whilst at the same time offering certain shells, magic wood (with supposed healing properties), seeds, beads and also animal parts as a remedy for all kinds of diseases.

It is customary that when a person dies that these Fanery are buried with them, with the result that over time these have for the most part vanished and today are exceedingly scarce. It does happen that when silver in the form of old coins becomes available, the traditional silver Fanery gets copied.

Monnaie Coupée 
Prior to 1895 there was no local currency. The silver coins that came from abroad were often cut into smaller pieces to satisfy the need for smaller denominations.
These bits were called "Monnaie Coupee".

In certain Southern areas the inhabitants preferred to transform the foreign coins into Fanery.
This they did both for decorative and practical purposes. For the first time they used also copper coins to make Fanery, and these looked attractive when strung on a necklace. One can be reasonably certain that the "Monnaie Coupee" and Fanery circulated in the different areas at the same time, possibly also with other forms of payment.

Use of Fanery 
Over the past 200 years Fanery have been used for various purposes:

For jewellery 
As pendants on necklaces

For medicinal purposes 
As "fanafody" or traditional medication

In Madagascar for many centuries (and even up to the present day) all forms of money have been used by the Traditional healers. These "lucky charms" were either worn around the neck or placed on the body parts to be healed.

As an instrument of payment 
It can be assumed that Fanery also had a monetary value. The silver coins found in Madagascar usually had a weight of 25 grams which could conveniently be converted into 10-12 silver Fanery. These silver Fanery had a certain value in relation to copper Fanery, but any supposed standard rate of exchange remains unknown. The situation is complicated by the fact that copper Fanery varied greatly in size and hence in weight. Just how much copper Fanery was required to match a silver piece is unknown at this stage.

As mentioned, original Fanery both in silver and copper have become very scarce today. Places where they may be found are threefold:
 On archeological sites such as old grave-yards and holy places.
 Some have been found together with other "holy objects" such as nails, coins, scissors, and cartridges on beaches and in shallow water. These were probably offerings.
 Many of the above-mentioned ombiasa or healers tend to carry Fanery with them. They use them to fabricate lucky charms, and together with beads and certain types of wood, they would have something to offer to ward off evil Spirits and counteract diseases.

These healers, when asked if they have any Fanery will invariably deny it.  They are most reluctant to even show them to Vazahas (white men/foreigners). They tend to regard us as powerful magicians, able to construct such magic things as cars and airplanes, and they fear that in our possession their Fanery could lose its healing properties. Moreover, for much the same reason, anyone wearing a Fanery around their neck will immediately conceal it if they spot a white person approaching.

One should note that in the last 70 years, with French coins readily available such as the nickel coins of the Twenties and Thirties and the aluminium coins of the Forties and Fifties, craftsmen have started to fabricate new Fanery. These 20th Century pieces can be found with ombiasa or healers at most of the local markets where medicinal herbs and lucky charms are sold.

A collection of fanery collected over a long period of time with the assistance of locals in the remote regions of Betioky, Ampanihy and Bekily, where local beliefs and traditions still prevail, is presented in the photo gallery together with coins from which they were manufactured in the past.

References 

Currencies of Madagascar
History of Madagascar
Modern obsolete currencies